Michael E. Kinsley (born March 9, 1951) is an American political journalist and commentator. Primarily active in print media as both a writer and editor, he also became known to television audiences as a co-host on Crossfire.

Early life and education 
Kinsley was born in Detroit, Michigan, the son of Lillian (Margolis) and George Kinsley, who practiced medicine. Kinsley is Jewish. He attended the Cranbrook School in Bloomfield Hills, Michigan, then graduated from Harvard College in 1972. At Harvard, Kinsley served as vice president of the university's daily newspaper, The Harvard Crimson. He was awarded a Rhodes Scholarship and studied at Magdalen College, Oxford, then returned to Harvard for law school.

Early career 
While a third-year law student, Kinsley began working at The New Republic. He was allowed to finish his Harvard juris doctor degree through courses at the evening program at The George Washington University Law School.

Kinsley's first exposure to a national television audience was as moderator of William Buckley's Firing Line. In 1979, he became editor of The New Republic and wrote the magazine's TRB column for most of the 1980s and 1990s. That column was reprinted in a variety of newspaper op-ed pages, including The Washington Post, and made Kinsley's reputation as a leading political writer. He shared the 1986 Gerald Loeb Award for Commentary.

Kinsley also served as managing editor of Washington Monthly (in the mid-1970s, while still in school), editor at Harper's (for a year and a half in the early 1980s), and American editor of The Economist (a short-term, honorary position).

Crossfire and Slate
From 1989 to 1995, Kinsley appeared on CNN's Crossfire, co-hosting with conservative Pat Buchanan. Representing the liberal position in the televised political debates, Kinsley combined a dry wit with nerdy demeanor and analytical skills.

In January 1995, Kinsley had a cameo on the first episode of the TV sitcom Women of the House, in which the show's main character, Suzanne Sugarbaker, was a guest on Crossfire. He also appeared in three movies during the 1990s: Rising Sun (1993), Dave (also 1993), and The Birdcage (1996).

After leaving Crossfire in 1995, Kinsley returned to his editorial roots, relocating to Seattle to become founding editor of Microsoft's online journal, Slate. In 1998 he was considered for the position of editor in chief of The New Yorker, but it was ultimately awarded to David Remnick. In 1999 he was named Editor of the Year by the Columbia Journalism Review for his work at Slate.

Kinsley stepped down from Slate in 2002, shortly after disclosing that he had Parkinson's disease.

Subsequent positions

Kinsley next moved to the Los Angeles Times as editorial page editor in April 2004. He maintained his Seattle residence and often worked from there, commuting to Los Angeles on a part-time basis. During his tenure, Kinsley tried to overhaul the paper's editorial page and led an abortive experiment with a Wikitorial, while also receiving criticism from USC professor and feminist advocate Susan Estrich alleging a dearth of editorials written by women. Kinsley announced his departure in September 2005 after a falling out with the publisher.

He returned to writing a weekly column for The Washington Post and Slate, and in 2006 he served briefly as American editor of The Guardian. He also became a regular columnist for Time magazine, but in May 2009 wrote that the magazine had "dumped" him.

On September 9, 2010, Kinsley and MSNBC pundit Joe Scarborough joined the staff of Politico as the publication's first opinion columnists. On April 29, 2011, Bloomberg L.P. announced that Kinsley had joined the Bloomberg View editorial board. In January 2013, Kinsley re-joined The New Republic as editor at large. In January 2014, Vanity Fair announced that Kinsley would become a contributing editor and write a monthly column.

Personal life
In 2002, Kinsley married Patty Stonesifer, a longtime top executive at Microsoft and the Bill and Melinda Gates Foundation. (As a Microsoft vice president, she had managed the Microsoft news portion of the MSNBC merger, which included Slate.) Stonesifer has two adult children from a previous marriage. She is president and CEO of Martha's Table, a non-profit that develops sustainable solutions to poverty.

In 2002, Kinsley revealed that he had Parkinson's disease, and on July 12, 2006, he underwent deep brain stimulation, a type of surgery designed to reduce its symptoms. According to a humorous postscript to his Time column anticipating the surgery, the operation went well; Kinsley's first words out of the operating room were "Well, of course, when you cut taxes, government revenues go up. Why couldn't I see that before?"

See also

 Kinsley gaffe
 List of newspaper columnists

References

Further reading 
 "Mine Is Longer Than Yours".  New Yorker Magazine. April 7, 2008.
 Book: [https://web.archive.org/web/20081202211629/http://www2.wwnorton.com/catalog/spring08/006654.htm Please Don't Remain Calm: Provocations and Commentaries"] (W. W. Norton, 2008)
 "Michael Kinsley's First Bloomberg View Column: What it should say" Slate magazine''.  April 27, 2011.

External links 

 
 Kinsley's website, such as it is
 Michael Kinsley's other website
 Archive of Kinsley work at Time magazine
 Video interview/discussion with Kinsley and Robert Wright on Bloggingheads.tv
 

1951 births
Living people
American atheists
American columnists
American male journalists
American political commentators
American political writers
Jewish American journalists
American Rhodes Scholars
American online publication editors
Cranbrook Educational Community alumni
The Harvard Crimson people
Alumni of Magdalen College, Oxford
Harvard Law School alumni
Los Angeles Times people
People with Parkinson's disease
Writers from Detroit
Writers from Seattle
The New Republic people
Slate (magazine) people
George Washington University Law School alumni
Harvard College alumni
Gerald Loeb Award winners for Columns, Commentary, and Editorials
Politico people